Theodore Melfi is an American filmmaker. His second film, St. Vincent starring Bill Murray, was released in 2014. In 2016, Melfi co-wrote, directed, and produced Hidden Figures with Allison Schroeder, for which he received Oscar nominations for Best Picture and Best Adapted Screenplay. He is of Italian descent.

Filmography

References

External links 

Interview from 9 October 2014

People from Brooklyn
Film producers from New York (state)
American male screenwriters
Film directors from New York City
American people of Italian descent
Screenwriters from New York (state)
Year of birth missing (living people)
Living people